Leaving Fishers (1997) is a young adult novel written by Margaret Peterson Haddix centering on a high school girl, Dorry Stevens, and her descent into and escape from a religious cult called The Fishers of Men.

Background
Haddix's inspiration for Leaving Fishers was a newspaper article she had written about a local church that was accused of being a cult. She decided to write about a teenage girl who had left a cult-like religion, and explored what would draw her to such a group. Because of the book's religious angle, Haddix said it was particularly difficult to write.

Plot summary
Dorry Stevens, a lonely new transfer to Indianapolis, is befriended by a group of attractive and attentive young classmates who invite her to a number of church functions. Their warm welcome has quite an effect on her, and she is soon baptized into her new faith at a Fishers retreat. 

After returning from the retreat, Dorry finds out that her mother has had a heart attack. Her family life becomes more difficult as bad grades pile up and pressure increases from the Fishers for her to gain "virtue" points and abstain from sin. Eventually, after a particularly bad incident concerning children she babysits, she leaves the oppressive cult and forms her own group of "Seekers", those hollowed from their experiences in Fishers. Her faith in God remains strong, and she considers herself to be searching for the truth.

Characters
Dorry Stevens
 Dorry thinks of herself as an unattractive, friendless nobody. As a result of her father's factory job transfer, Dorry moves out of her tiny hometown and into the city of Indianapolis. She is befriended by Angela Briarstone, Brad, Michael, Jay, Lara, and Kim, and becomes involved in The Fishers of Men, a "religious group" that is actually a cult. Even while giving into the cult's high demands and swallowing her voice of reason, Dorry manages to befriend a family, Mrs. Garringer and her daughters Zoe and Jasmine, whom she babysits. Later she befriends a boy named Zachary, who has also broken free from the Fishers.

Angela Briarstone
 Angela is a wealthy, beautiful blonde high school student fanatically involved with the Fishers of Men. She appears kind to Dorry but is really feeding her half-truths and lies to get Dorry to fall into the Fishers. She is mentioned by Zachary as one of the leader of the Fishers' "favorites," meaning she allegedly had premarital sex with him.

Brad
 Brad is a well-off, handsome (with blue eyes and straight black hair), charming, and funny high school member of the Fishers of Men. Dorry has a crush on him throughout the book and confesses to Angela to have lusted after him. He unsuccessfully attempts to sway Dorry back to the Fishers after she leaves with a promise of a date.

Lara
 Lara admitted to Dorry that, before becoming a Fisher, she was a promiscuous atheist from age twelve to fourteen. She was converted to Fishers by their leader, Pastor Jim, and is one of the more devout believers, desiring "to convert everybody on the planet." She later has a nervous breakdown and is put into a mental hospital. She has straight brown hair and a plain face, easily fading into the background.

Jay, Michael, and Kim
 Dorry's Fisher friends. Jay is described as quiet and "cute...if you ignored his acne." Michael, like all the male Fisher friends, is described as cute. Kim, like Jay, is one of the quieter Fishers. The three have minor roles in the book.

Pastor Jim
 Pastor Jim is the charismatic leader of the Fisher of Men cult. He is around five foot eight, skinny, with thick, stylish brown hair and mustache, and piercing green eyes. He has gathered many followers and is reported to have embezzled money and had sex with "probably...half the girls in Fishers," by telling the girls it's their sacrifice for God. He never attempts anything with Dorry. 

Zachary
 Zachary is a shy-looking boy and introduced as a scientific genius by Pastor Jim. Later in the book, after he and Dorry have broken away from the cult, they befriend the other. He is bent on getting the Fishers of Men recognized officially as a cult.

Mr. & Mrs. Stevens
 Dorry's parents strongly disapprove of their daughter's growing involvement with the Fishers of Men. Mr. Stevens is a stern father and factory worker, and Mrs. Stevens, (first name Reenie), works at a nursing home. They had Dorry later in life than typically. Mrs. Stevens has a heart attack, but recovers.

The Garringer Family
 Dorry first meets the Garringer family, (excluding Mr. Garringer), when the Fishers arrange for her to babysit the children. In order from eldest to youngest, their children are Jasmine, Zoe, and baby Seth. The Garringers are wealthy enough for Mrs. Garringer not to need to work, and thus she is able to pursue her interests in art. When Dorry is forced into attempting to convert someone to the Fishers, she tells Jasmine and Zoe, both young children, about hell and Fishers. Their and Mrs. Garringer's bad reactions to the attempt and Angela's following cruel words are the final straws for Dorry, and she leaves the Fishers of Men. Later, after she has left Fishers, she attempts to reconcile with Mrs. Garringer, discussing her feelings about the cult. Mrs. Garringer accepts Dorry's apology although she has by now hired a new babysitter. She also mentions that her children are no longer afraid of hell as she got a dog who they believe will "protect them" from hell's fire.

Reception
The book was praised by young adult fiction reviewers. Kirkus Reviews described it as "tightly written, with well-drawn characters, and demonstrating insight into the psychology of belief and affiliation." Publishers Weekly called the book's greatest strength Haddix's "even-handed portrayal" of religious subject matter, and Ed Sullivan  of Booklist praised the book's deeper treatment of crises of faith.

References

External links
 Margaret Peterson Haddix official author Web site

American young adult novels
Novels by Margaret Peterson Haddix
1997 American novels
Novels set in Indianapolis